Seco Camara (born 20 April 1995) is an Olympic sprinter from Guinea-Bissau.

Camara ran a personal best time of 11.33 seconds when he competed at the Athletics at the 2020 Summer Olympics – Men's 100 metres in Tokyo.

References

1995 births
Living people
Athletes (track and field) at the 2020 Summer Olympics
Olympic athletes of Guinea-Bissau
Bissau-Guinean male sprinters